The 2020 United States Men's Curling Championship was held from February 8 to 15, 2020 at the Eastern Washington University Recreation Center in Spokane, Washington. The event was held in conjunction with the 2020 United States Women's Curling Championship. John Shuster claimed his seventh United States Championship, defeating Rich Ruohonen in the final.

Since Team Shuster met certain prerequisites in terms of world ranking points (60 points year-to-date or ranked 70th or higher) they would have represented the United States at the 2020 World Men's Curling Championship, which was scheduled to be held in Glasgow, Scotland from March 28 to April 5, 2020 but was cancelled due to the COVID-19 pandemic.  The United States Champions also earn a spot at the final Grand Slam of the season, the Champions Cup, which was also cancelled due to the pandemic. Team Shuster's qualification will instead carry over to the 2021 Champions Cup.

Qualification
There were three ways for teams to qualify for the championship:

 Top five American teams in the World Curling Federation (WCF) World Team Ranking System on Dec 2, 2019
 Team Dropkin
 Team Ruohonen
 Team Shuster
 Team Dunnam
 Team Birr
 Four teams from the 2020 United States Men's Challenge Round
 Team Brundidge
 Team Kakela
 Team Maerki
Team Violette Team Birklid *replaced with alternate due to conflict with World Junior Championships
 A team from the 2020 United States Junior Men's Championship
 Team Sinnett

Challenge round
Sixteen teams competed at the 2020 United States Men's Challenge Round, held at the Grand Forks Curling Club in Grand Forks, North Dakota, from January 2 to 5. Through a triple knockout competition the top four teams secured a spot at the National Championship. Jed Brundidge was the first to secure a spot, defeating Dominik Märki in the 'A' bracket final. Märki then dropped down to the 'B' bracket final and had another opportunity to play for a spot in the Nationals, but this time lost to Kyle Kakela who took the second Nationals berth. In the 'C' bracket Märki finally earned their spot when they defeated Steven Birklid's team. On the other side of the 'C' bracket Luc Violette defeated Nicholas Connolly for the fourth and final Nationals berth. Steven Birklid's team finished the Challenge Round as the alternate team.

Teams
Ten teams participated in the 2020 national championship.

Round-robin standings 
Final round-robin standings

Round-robin results
All draw times are listed in Pacific Standard Time (UTC−08:00).

Draw 1
Saturday, February 8, 7:30 pm

Draw 2
Sunday, February 9, 12:00 pm

Draw 3
Sunday, February 9, 8:00 pm

Draw 4
Monday, February 10, 10:00 am

Draw 5
Monday, February 10, 7:00 pm

Draw 6
Tuesday, February 11, 2:00 pm

Draw 7
Wednesday, February 12, 9:00 am

Draw 8
Wednesday, February 12, 7:00 pm

Draw 9
Thursday, February 13, 2:00 pm

Playoffs

1 vs. 2
Friday, February 14, 12:00 pm

3 vs. 4
Friday, February 14, 12:00 pm

Semifinal
Friday, February 14, 7:00 pm

Final
Saturday, February 15, 5:00 pm

References

United States National Curling Championships
Curling in Washington (state)
Sports competitions in Spokane, Washington
United States Men's
Curling, United States Men's
Curling, United States Men's
Eastern Washington University